Merak is a forward village on the southern banks of Pangong Tso, near Spangmik on the south India-China border in the Leh District, Ladakh.

History 
Merak is situated 176 kilometers east of Leh, on the southern banks of Pangong Tso. It is directly opposite to Finger 3 which is located on the northern bank of the lake.

In 2018, a telescope was installed to study solar chromosphere. The new installation named as Indian Astronomical Observatory, Merak.

In 2021, the village got its first tap water supply. Also, BSNL, a state-run telecom service provider got approval from Indian Army for a 25-km optical fibre cable link between Merak and Chushul for civilian telecom traffic.

Gallery

References 

Villages in Durbuk tehsil